The Concordat of 11 June 1817 was a concordat between the kingdom of France and the Holy See, signed on 11 June 1817.  Not having been validated, it never came into force in France and so the country remained under the regime outlined in the Concordat of 1801 until the 1905 law on the Separation of the Churches and the State.

Representatives
Representing Pope Pius VII was Cardinal Ercole Consalvi, the papal Secretary of State. He had already negotiated the 1801 Concordat, and was designated the plenipotentiary for the 1817 negotiations.  King Louis XVIII of France chose his favorite, the Ambassador to Rome, the Comte de Blacas, who had previously served as the Prime Minister of France, to negotiate the Concordat of 1817.

Text
The Concordat's introduction (1st article) was a repetition of that of the Concordat of Bologna, but the other articles laid down restrictions on this "re-establishment" of the Concordat of Bologna.

A revised ecclesiastical geography
One of the accord's objectives was to increase the number of dioceses in France.  Another important article (article 4) stipulated that the dioceses in the kingdom of France suppressed by the bull of the Holy See of 29 November 1801 were to be re-established in such a number as both sides would agree on as the most advantageous for the good of religion.

(*)In italics, dioceses elevated to the rank of archdioceses.
(**)In bold, dioceses and archdioceses that were foreseen to be created or re-established. Not all of them were.

References

Bibliography

External links
 French text of the Concordat

1817
1817
Bourbon Restoration
1817 in France
1817 treaties
Unratified treaties
France–Holy See relations
1817 in the Papal States